His Way could refer to:

His Way (film) - documentary film about Jerry Weintraub
"His Way" (Star Trek: Deep Space Nine), episode of Star Trek: Deep Space Nine
His Way,  a biography of Frank Sinatra by Kitty Kelley
His Way: The Very Best of Frank Sinatra, 4 CD Collection

See also 
His Way, Our Way - a Frank Sinatra tribute album